Al-Hadā mountain resort city is a city in Makkah Province, in western Saudi Arabia near Ta'if. Having many five star hotels and theme Parks, it is attractive for tourists. Nearby is Jabal Hada.

See also 

 List of cities and towns in Saudi Arabia
 Regions of Saudi Arabia

References

External links 

Populated places in Mecca Province
At-Ta'if